The Stability Pact for Southeastern Europe was an institution aimed at strengthening peace, democracy, human rights and economy in the countries of South Eastern Europe from 1999 to 2008.  It was replaced by the Regional Cooperation Council (RCC) in February 2008. The RCC replaced it because it is more "regionally owned" than the Stability Pact, which was driven more by outside partners such as the EU.

Membership 

 Member partners:
 
 
 
 
 
 
 
 
 
 Observer:
 
 Supporting partners:
 
 
 
 
 
 
  member states
 Multiple international organizations.

Creation 
The pact was created at the initiative of the European Union on June 10, 1999, in Cologne. All of the countries of the region, except for Serbia and Montenegro (then FR Yugoslavia) and Moldova, were present at the founding conference. Representatives of Bulgaria, Romania, Russia, Turkey, United States, all members of the EU at the time, OSCE, Council of Europe and European Commission were also considered active participants.

Representatives of Canada, Japan, United Nations, UNHCR, NATO, OECD, Western European Union, International Monetary Fund, World Bank, European Investment Bank and European Bank for Reconstruction and Development were present as facilitators.

The pact was created following the escalation of Kosovo War; stability of Kosovo was among the primary objectives.

In 2006 it was announced that the Stability Pact should be succeeded in early 2008 by a more regionally owned co-operation framework, the Regional Cooperation Council (RCC) formed by the countries of the region themselves, but with continued support and advice from the international community. The South-East European Cooperation Process should be playing an important role in this process.

The last meeting of the SPSEE took place on 28 February 2008, in Sofia, Bulgaria when it was succeeded by the Regional Cooperation Council.

Organization 
The Special Coordinator was a head of the Stability Pact. The first Special Coordinator was Bodo Hombach. Since 2002, the position was held by Erhard Busek.

The pact was divided among three Working Tables, with the fourth, Regional Working Table, coordinating actions between them.

Each of the Working Tables was responsible for a set of issues, working with participant countries' governments and NGOs on resolving them.

Achievements

Regional Table

Working Table 1 
Consists of five task forces: Media, Education and Youth, Local Democracy and Cross Border Cooperation, Parliamentary Cooperation and Gender Issues.

Apart from its Director WT I relies on the work of two experts Srđan Cvijić and Talia Boati.

Working Table 2 
 Completed a matrix of bilateral free trade agreements (FTAs) between countries of the region.
 Kosovo is also participating (represented by UNMIK as per UN Security Council resolution 1244), but not all FTAs with it are ready yet.
 There is a proposal to unite the multiple FTAs (including full coverage of Kosovo) into a single free trade area (maybe by extension of Central European Free Trade Agreement). Agreement was due to be signed by the first half of 2006.
 Formation of a South-East Europe Regional Energy Market for electricity and natural gas. Participating are the member partners of the pact (without Moldova) as well as Greece and Turkey.
 This process was also enhanced by the recent creation of a common European Energy Community between the European Union and the countries participating in the pact (without Moldova) and Kosovo. Turkey has delayed its participation with six months, because of problems with implementation of the environment parts of the acquis communautaire. Moldova, Ukraine and Norway are expected to join later.

Working Table 3 
Working Table III deals with questions of both internal and external security. The aim is to establish a stable security environment in the region and to promote regional co-operation in fighting organised crime and corruption and on migration issues. It is divided into two sub-tables. The first one deals with Justice and Home Affairs and the second one with Defence and Security Sector Reform issues.

FTA progress (until February 2008)

See also 
 European Union Association Agreement
 European Neighbourhood Policy
 Euro-Mediterranean free trade area
 EU Strategy for the South Caucasus
 South-East European Cooperation Process (SEECP)
 Central European Free Trade Agreement (CEFTA)
 Central European Initiative (CEI)
 Southeast European Cooperative Initiative (SECI)
 Black Sea Economic Co-operation (BSEC)
 Southeast Europe Transport Community
 Potential enlargement of the European Union

References

External links
 Stability Pact Initiative against organised crime

History of Southeastern Europe
Balkans
International relations
Black Sea organizations